Sunnybank Hills is an outer southern suburb in the City of Brisbane, Queensland, Australia. In the 2021 census, Sunnybank Hills had a population of 18,085 people.

Geography 
It is a large suburb, and adjoins the suburbs of Calamvale, Coopers Plains, Sunnybank, MacGregor, Algester, Acacia Ridge and Runcorn.

Sunnybank Hills has numerous ridges and hills, with lower wetter areas in the north and east. These form the marshes near Sunnybank and Runcorn railway stations. There are many parks and greenspaces in the area. The soil is fertile and watered by numerous small creeks, including a large one that flows north–south across the suburb, and the suburb borders on the small wildfowl habitat and wetlands of neighbouring Calamvale Creek.

History 
Sunnybank Hills was originally part of a much larger area known as Coopers Plains. In 1885, the railway line was extended from Yeerongpilly, and names had to be given to the railway stations built along the line. One of the stations was named after a local farm, Sunny Brae, when  of land were taken over for the railway. Brae is the Scottish word for the English word bank, so the area was given boundaries and named Sunnybank. The area of Sunnybank Hills was officially defined in 1971, although it had been unofficially called this for many years.

Autism Therapy & Education Centre opened on 23 July 1977.

Sunnybank Hills State School No 1889 opened on 30 January 1979.

The Sunnybank Hills Public Library opened in 1987 with a major refurbishment in 2009.

The median age of the Sunnybank Hills population was 34 years, 3 years below the Australian median. Children aged under 15 years made up 16.3% of the population and people aged 65 years and over made up 12.4% of the population. Sunnybank Hills is a very multicultural suburb. 46.7% of people living in Sunnybank Hills were born in Australia, compared to the national average of 69.8%; the next most common countries of birth were China 10.5%, Taiwan 6.6%, New Zealand 4.3%, India 2.5%, England 2.2%. Just under half (49.7%) of people spoke only English at home; the next most popular languages were 17.8% Mandarin, 6.5% Cantonese, 2.3% Vietnamese, 2.2% Korean, 1.2% Greek. Almost half (47%) of the family households in the suburb were couples with children, 35% were couples without children, 15% are single-parent households, and 3% are classified as "other family". The great majority (85%) of the dwellings in the suburb are stand-alone houses; townhouses account for another 12%. The houses are mainly modern brick and tile houses but there is a sprinkling of post-war weatherboard homes in the area. The most common religious affiliation was "No Religion" (24.3%); the next most common responses were Catholic 20.1%, Anglican 9.6%, Buddhism 9.0% and Uniting Church 5.5%.

Amenities 
The Brisbane City Council operates a public library in Sunnybank Hills in the Sunnybank Hills Shopping Centre at the corner of Compton and Calam Roads.

Churches in Sunnybank Hills include the Southside International Church on the corner of Pinelands and Beenleigh Roads, and Sunnybank Hills Uniting Church on the corner of Hellawell Road and Hillcrest Street.

The suburb is serviced by several shopping centres. These include Shauna Downs on the corner of Wynne Street and Beenleigh Road, Centro Pinelands on Mains Road, and the large Sunnybank Hills Shoppingtown on the corner of Compton & Calam Roads. Sunnybank Hills Shoppingtown features a Woolworths supermarket, Coles supermarket, K Mart, Priceline, Best & Less, The Reject Shop, Lincraft, Aldi, library and 75 specialty stores.

Approximately 25% (ABS 2006 Census) of the population is Asian born, and the cultural scene is brought to life with many Asian restaurants, along with numerous coffee shops and eateries of many cultures. Restaurants in Sunnybank Hills and neighbouring Sunnybank include Thai, Korean, Vietnamese, Chinese, Japanese, Indian and Italian cuisines.

Education 
Sunnybank Hills State School is a government primary (Prep-6) school for boys and girls at 77 Symons Road. In 2018, the school had an enrolment of 1376 students with 94 teachers (84 full-time equivalent) and 59 non-teaching staff (38 full-time equivalent). It includes a special education program.

Autism Queensland Education & Therapy Centre is a private primary and secondary (Prep-12) school for boys and girls at 437 Hellawell Road. In 2018, the school had an enrolment of 144 students with 24 teachers (18 full-time equivalent) and 85 non-teaching staff (37 full-time equivalent).

There is no government secondary school in Sunnybank Hills. The nearest government secondary school is Sunnybank State High School in neighbouring Sunnybank to the north.

Transport 
Many bus stops with buses running directly to the city every couple of minutes during peak times (does not require transfer). The suburb is also serviced by the train stations, Sunnybank and Altandi, which provide services to the Brisbane CBD and Beenleigh lines.

References 

 
 Australian Bureau of Statistics
 
 

Suburbs of the City of Brisbane
Populated places established in 1971
1971 establishments in Australia